The River Faughan is a river in northwest Northern Ireland.

Legend

According to Lebor Gabála Érenn (11th century), Fochain was a daughter of Partholón, an ancient settler of Ireland. In the Táin Bó Cúailnge, Cúchulainn meets with Medb and Fergus mac Róich in Glenn Fochaine.

Course
The River Faughan rises on Sawel Mountain, north of Park and flows northwestwards through Claudy, crossing the A6 west of Drumahoe. It flows northwards on the eastern edge of Derry city, being bridged by the A2 between Campsey and Strathfoyle. The Faughan enters Lough Foyle east of Coolkeeragh power station.

Wildlife

The River Faughan is a brown trout and salmon fishery.

In culture

"The Faughan Side" is a traditional Irish song from the early 20th century, sung by Eddie Butcher.

The river gives its name to Faughan Valley Golf Club, near Eglinton.

See also

Rivers of Ireland

References

Rivers of County Londonderry